Alfonso Cuarón is a Mexican film director, screenwriter, cinematographer and editor. His most notable films include the children's fantasy drama A Little Princess (1995), the romantic drama Great Expectations (1998), the coming of age drama Y tu mamá también (2001), the fantasy film Harry Potter and the Prisoner of Azkaban (2004), the dystopian drama Children of Men (2006), the science fiction film Gravity (2013), and Mexican drama film Roma (2018).

Feature films

Short films

Documentary shorts

Executive producer

Television

References 

Director filmographies
 
Mexican filmographies